Michael Parris (born October 4, 1957), aka Michael Anthony, is a retired boxer from Guyana, who competed in the bantamweight (< 54 kg) division at the 1980 Summer Olympics in Moscow, Soviet Union. There he won the bronze medal (Guyana's only ever medal at the Olympics), after being defeated by Cuba's Juan Hernández in the semifinals. He was born in Georgetown, Guyana.

1980 Olympic results
Below is the record of Michael Anthony, a Guyanese bantamweight boxer who competed at the 1980 Moscow Olympics:

Round of 32: Defeated Nureni Gbadamosi (Nigeria) by decision, 5-0
Round of 16: Defeated Fayez Zaghloul (Syria) by decision, 3-2
Quarterfinal: Defeated Daniel Zaragoza (Mexico) TKO 2
Semifinal: Lost to Juan Hernandez (Cuba) by decision, 0-5 (was awarded bronze medal)

References

External links
 databaseOlympics.com

1957 births
Living people
Sportspeople from Georgetown, Guyana
Afro-Guyanese people
Bantamweight boxers
Boxers at the 1978 Commonwealth Games
Commonwealth Games competitors for Guyana
Boxers at the 1980 Summer Olympics
Olympic boxers of Guyana
Olympic bronze medalists for Guyana
Olympic medalists in boxing
Medalists at the 1980 Summer Olympics
Guyanese male boxers